Kanne Pappa is a 1969 Indian Tamil-language comedy film, directed by P. Madhavan. The film stars K. R. Vijaya, R. Muthuraman, Baby Rani and J. P. Chandrababu. The film was remade in Hindi by Madhavan as Aansoo Aur Muskan and also in Telugu as Bhale Papa.

Plot

Cast 
K. R. Vijaya as Kalyani and Kalpana
R. Muthuraman as Bhaskar
Baby Rani as Lakshmi
J. P. Chandrababu as Kannaiah
C. R. Vijayakumari as Margaret
Thengai Srinivasan as Pattakathi Mannaru
M. N. Nambiar as Inspector James
Manorama as Roopa
V. K. Ramasamy as Nanda Gopala Samy
Major Sundarrajan
 Rama Prabha as Subbhamma
C. K. Saraswathi as Andalammal
Kannan as Shankar
 V. S. Raghavan as Station Master
Suruli Rajan as Dharman
 Pakoda Kadhar as Mandu

Soundtrack 
The music was composed by M. S. Viswanathan, with lyrics by Kannadasan.

Reception 
The Indian Express wrote, "Kanne Pappa is a miserable attempt at producing a rather intelligent and interesting story. What really marred the picture is the most unimaginative screenplay and the equally incompetent direction." Baby Rani won the Tamil Nadu State Film Award for Best Child Artist.

References

External links 
 

1960s Tamil-language films
1969 films
Films directed by P. Madhavan
Films scored by M. S. Viswanathan
Tamil films remade in other languages